Polyuronide is a polymeric substance which consists of uronic acid units that have glycosidic linkages which are commonly combined with monosaccharides.

Sources 
Polyuronide widely occurs in soil and plants (such as gums and pectic substances).

Studies 
There are many scientific studies about polyuronide in plants. However, the most studied is the presence of polyuronide in avocado and tomato. There is also a study about its occurrence in barrel cactus.

Examples 

 Glucoronic acid
 Galactoronic acid

References

External links 
 The Free Dictionary: polyuronides

Organic polymers
Uronic acids